Following is a list of senators of Haute-Saône, people who have represented the department of Haute-Saône in the Senate of France.

Third Republic

Senators for Haute-Saône under the French Third Republic were:

 Adéodat Dufournel (1876–1882)
 Louis Jobard (1876–1891)
 Jean Noblot (1882–1891)
 Jean-Baptiste Levrey (1891–1900)
 Achille Coillot (1893–1900)
 Jean-Baptiste Brusset (1891–1897)
 Maurice Signard (1897–1900 and 1903)
 Gustave Gauthier (1900–1909)
 Charles Bontemps (1900–1903)
 Gaston Outhenin-Chalandre (1900–1907)
 Victor Genoux-Prachée (1904-1920)
 Maurice Couyba (1907–1920)
 Jules Jeanneney (1909–1927)
 Anatole Gras (1920–1927)
 Henry Marsot (1920–1927)
 Jules Hayaux (1927–1936)
 Jules Jeanneney (1927–1940)
 Alcime Renaudot (1927–1936)
 André Maroselli (1936–1940)
 Moïse Levy (1936–1940)

Fourth Republic

Senators for Haute-Saône under the French Fourth Republic were:

 Marcellin Carraud, républicain indépendant (1958)
 Henri Pretre, républicain indépendant (1958)
 Fernand Perrot-Migeon, gauche démocratique (1952-1958)
 André Maroselli, radical-socialiste (1952-1956)
 Pierre Vitter, RPF (1948-1952)
 René Depreux, RPF (1946-1952)

Fifth Republic 
Senators for Haute-Saône under the French Fifth Republic:

References

Sources

 
Lists of members of the Senate (France) by department